Chromosome 9 open reading frame 152 is a protein that in humans is encoded by the C9orf152 gene. The exact function of the protein is not completely understood.

Gene
The human gene C9orf152 is located on the long (q) arm of Chromosome 9. Its cytogenetic location is 9q31.1. It has one known alias: bA470J20.2. 
The DNA sequence encoding C9orf152 contains a single intron. The final mRNA consists of 2698 base pairs. Nucleotides 66-68 encode an upstream in frame stop codon.

Evolution
C9orf152 has orthologs in mammals, birds, reptiles and amphibians. No orthologs have been detected in bony fish or in any invertebrates. The following table lists a subset of conserved orthologs.

Differences among shown orthologs suggest a slow rate of evolution.

Protein
Chromosome 9 open reading frame 152 contains 239 amino acids. The molecular weight is 26.3 kilodaltons. The protein has a high chance of existing nuclear region of cells. There are likely no transmembrane regions. One isoform exists, containing 194 amino acids.

Within the coding sequence, there are two sumoylation sites and a single serine phosphorylation site.

There are three regions predicted to form alpha helices on the final protein.

Expression

C9orf152 is expressed in the bladder, intestine, mammary gland, and trachea and in smaller amounts in the lungs, liver, prostate, uterus, and brain. Within the brain, expression of C9orf152 is limited to the olfactory bulb. Gene expression was found to increase in the presence of stress, including disease and heat stress.

A wide variety of transcription factors interact with the promoter of C9orf152, most notably two olfactory related factors (specifically, a neuron-specific olfactory factor and an olfactory associated zinc finger protein) and a negative glucocorticoid response element.

References

External links
 

Genes on human chromosome 9
Uncharacterized proteins